Fifis Ioannou (Φιφής Ιωάννου in Greek; 1914 — 1988), was a Cypriot politician and editor.

Ioannou was born in Nicosia, Cyprus in 1914. He succeeded Ploutis Servas in 1945 as the Secretary General of AKEL, a position he held until 1949.

He was the head editor of various Cypriot newspapers and president of the Union of Cyprus Journalists from 1973 to 1979.

References
 http://www.ardin.gr/node/1604
 http://www.lemoni.gr/shop/author.asp?ID=55379

1914 births
1988 deaths
People from Nicosia
Greek Cypriot politicians
Progressive Party of Working People politicians
Leaders of the Progressive Party of Working People